Brodsworth is a village, civil parish and suburb of Doncaster in the City of Doncaster district in South Yorkshire, England. situated about five miles north-west of Doncaster.  According to the 2001 census, it had a population of 2,875, increasing to 2,936 at the 2011 Census.

Historically, the parish of Brodsworth was much larger, but with the sinking of Brodsworth Colliery by the owners of Brodsworth Hall, the model village of Woodlands was built two miles away. On 1 April 1915, Woodlands was added to the parish of Adwick-le-Street since the colliery town had expanded to the stage where it joined Adwick. Brodsworth remained as a collection of farms and the estate village.

The local church, St Michael's, is an 11th-century church sited close to the hall built by the Thellusson family, owners of Brodsworth Hall, and is one of the four churches within the parish of Bilham, which is in the Sheffield diocese.

See also
Listed buildings in Brodsworth

References

External links

Villages in Doncaster
Civil parishes in South Yorkshire